Earl "Grisss" Insley (October 26, 1911 – September 30, 1958) was an American football coach and player. He served as the head football coach at his alma mater, Arizona State College at Flagstaff—now known as Northern Arizona University—from 1954 to 1955, compiling a record of 3–15. Insley was killed in a car crash in 1958.

As a player in 1932, he completed a pass on a fake PAT to upset the University of Arizona.

Head coaching record

References

1911 births
1958 deaths
American football placekickers
Northern Arizona Lumberjacks athletic directors
Northern Arizona Lumberjacks football coaches
Northern Arizona Lumberjacks football players